The Cleveland State Vikings women's volleyball team represents Cleveland State University in the Horizon League. They are currently led by head coach Chuck Voss and play their home games at Woodling Gym.

Record by year

Totals updated through the end of the 2016–2017 school year.

NCAA Tournament history

Head coaching history

See also
List of NCAA Division I women's volleyball programs

References

External links
 

women's volleyball